Triplophysa brachyptera is a species of stone loach in the genus Triplophysa. It is endemic to the Gansu Province, China. It grows to  SL.

References

B
Freshwater fish of China
Endemic fauna of Gansu
Taxa named by Solomon Herzenstein
Fish described in 1888